Sveḱani is an abandoned village in the municipality of Gradsko, North Macedonia.

Demographics
The settlement last had inhabitants in the 1961 census, where it was recorded as being populated by 11 Albanians and 5 Macedonians..

According to the 2002 census, the village had 0 inhabitants.

References

Villages in Gradsko Municipality
Albanian communities in North Macedonia